The Nebraska Educational Tower Holdrege is a  high guyed TV mast in Holdrege, Nebraska, USA. It is the transmission site for Nebraska Educational Telecommunications stations KLNE-TV and KLNE-FM, both licensed to Lexington.

The tower was built in 1965, but destroyed on November 27, 2005, after an aircraft collision. The tower was rebuilt on June 15, 2007.

See also
List of masts

External links
 Nebraska Educational Tower Holdrege at the Antenna Structure Registration

References

Towers completed in 1965
Towers completed in 2006
Towers in Nebraska
Buildings and structures in Phelps County, Nebraska
Radio masts and towers in the United States
1965 establishments in Nebraska